The Taiyuan southwest ring line is a twin-track electrified railway line in Taiyuan, Shanxi, China.

History 
Construction of the line was discussed as early as 2008. The line opened on 11 December 2019.

Route 
The line allows freight services to bypass Taiyuan and Taiyuan South stations and avoid central Taiyuan. It also connects freight stations including  railway station.

References 

Railway lines in China
Railway lines opened in 2019